Poste Italiane S.p.A. is the Italian postal service provider. Besides providing postal services, Italian Post Group offers communication, postal savings products, logistics, and financial and insurance services throughout Italy.

History

1862 – 1990
Law no. 604 of 5 May 1862 (the so-called Postal reform) created a national and centralised organisation for postal service by introducing a general fee to pay for services, including postal stamps, throughout the entire territory of the newly formed kingdom of Italy. Subsequently, with Royal Decree 5973 of 10 March 1889, the Directorate General of Posts and Telegraphs was separated from the Ministry of Public Works and thus turned into the Ministry of Posts and Telegraphs. It was commissioned to create a network of offices in Italy to forward and receive mail and telegrams, make and receive telephone calls, carry out financial transactions, and manage assets. It also worked as a branch office for the nascent electric services for a time.

The giro service (commonly known as BancoPosta since 2000) was founded in 1917. In 1924, during the Fascist period, the Ministry of Posts and Telegraphs was renamed the Ministry of Communications, becoming an important centre of power. The services network was expanded with the acquisition and implementation of new logistics facilities. New buildings in the Functionalist style were built in major cities.

With the development of telephony and radio communications, the Ministry incorporated the State Company for Telephone Services (ASST) and the nascent EIAR (which would later become RAI and run both public radio and television).

1990 – 2000
In the early 1990s, the Italian public administration and postal service were deemed irrecoverable in terms of efficiency and profitability. The budget deficit increased personnel costs, which in 1986 absorbed about 93% (including 16% for pensions) of the current revenue. From 1970 to 1985 employees’ productivity was reduced by 24% at the expense of the quality of services provided, generating an ever more critical deficit situation.

In 1994 the regular average of delivered daily mail after dispatch was less than 20% in Italy, compared to almost 80% in Germany. In 1989, the average time for mail delivery was 8.5 days.

An attempt was made to contain the obvious gap in the quality of Italian postal service compared to the rest of Europe, with Decree-Law no. 487 of 1 December 1993, converted by law no. 71 of 29 January 1994. This led to the transformation of the Italian Post Office from an independent company into a public business, with the additional step to S.p.A. being taken in 1996 (implemented after 28 February 1998).  

The transformation process required the management of the Italian postal services to adopt the production efficiency principle, recover the quality of services, and bring about economic and financial recovery.

There was a gradual reduction of the 4,500 billion lira deficit (as of 1993) through specific policies to reduce production costs (80% due to staff costs), by increasing revenues from the sale of services to the PA, and by reordering the tariff system, leading Poste Italiane S.p.A. to record a net profit by 2001.

In February 1998, the Ministry of the Treasury (The Prodi I Cabinet) appointed Corrado Passera as the CEO of the newly formed Poste Italiane S.p.A. The business plan implemented by Corrado Passera from 1998 to 2002 reduced staff by 22,000. According to trade union leaders, there was a casualization of contracts for new recruits, cases of widespread harassment, and resignation because of workload due to the excessive staff cuts.

The Solidarity Fund was used for saving on labour costs as well as lowering the average age of the staff. The last two years of missing contributions from employees taking early retirement were paid for by a deduction in payroll for the new employees for 10 years. The company offsets these losses by replacing them by recruiting many young workers under the age of 24 and giving them three-year apprenticeship contracts.

2000 – 2010
In 2000, the Italian Post Office, through its subsidiary SDA Express Courier, acquired 20% of the share capital of the Bartolini company  and officially formed the Consortium Logistics and Parcels with the three companies for the sorting of parcels in the country. This agreement was the subject of a challenge by the rival companies in court, but it ended in favour of the Consortium.

Poste Italiane S.p.A. adopted a control system for monitoring in real-time all the post offices, the logistics network and the security of digital communications and transactions working with the Italian government, international agencies, universities and research centres.

2010 – 2015
In 2011, Poste Italiane S.p.A. acquired UniCredit MedioCredito Centrale for €136 million.

On 16 May 2014, the Italian government approved the stakes sale of up to 40 per cent in Poste Italiane S.p.A.

In 2015, under CEO Francesco Caio, Poste Italiane S.p.A. closed 455 offices in 2015 due to low profit. Current CEO Matteo Del Fante stated in November 2018 that the company’s intention is to preserve post offices and take specific measures for smaller Italian cities.[4]

The Ministry of Economy and Finance (Italy), which now owns 64.696% of Poste Italiane SpA, sold about 35% of shares on Borsa Italiana. On 25 May 2016, a further 35% stake was transferred from the ministry to Cassa Depositi e Prestiti (CDP), making it the minority shareholder of the national investment bank. This has given it equity in stakes for Poste Italiane S.p.A. but has also diluted its voting rights in CDP.

2015 – present
From the date of listing on the stock exchange (27 October 2015) to 31 December 2021, Poste Italiane's share price increased by 71% (while the FTSEMIB index decreased by 20.8%), which helped in an overall return for shareholders (TSR) of +137% while the main Italian stock exchange index recorded a loss of 47%.

An annual report from 2021 recorded Poste Italiane S.p.A.'s turnover as over €11.2 billion, an EBIT of €1.8 billion, a net profit of €1.6 billion and a CAPEX of €754 million (Data source: Annual Report 2021).

During the COVID-19 pandemic, Poste Italiane was able to guarantee operational continuity and extensive cooperation with national institutions to support the logistical activities of the Italian National Protection Service.

Financial services
Poste Italiane S.p.A. provides financial services through the separate operations of BancoPosta in the Italian financial services market. Services include current accounts, promotion and distribution of loans provided by both banks and financial intermediates, and postal savings services. BancoPosta engages in similar activities.

As concerns asset management, BancoPosta Fondi SGR manages open-ended mutual investment funds, Eurozone sovereign bonds and corporate bonds.

Mail, Parcel and Distribution 
Poste Italiane S.p.A. provides Universal Postal Service throughout the country.

In 2018, Poste Italiane S.p.A. handled approximately 3 billion items of mail and 127 million parcels, In the Deliver 2022 Plan in 2018, the company launched the Joint Delivery Model, which introduced services such as afternoon and weekend deliveries. Additionally, 345 fully electric, three-wheeled scooters, stated to be more environmentally friendly and with greater load capacity, were introduced. PuntoPoste was created for e-commerce logistics, a network that complements the network of over 12,800 post offices, enabling the collection and return of online purchases and the sending of pre-franked or prepaid parcels. In 2018, 417 PuntoPoste points were already operating, and the network was anticipated to be expanded to include 3,500 units by 2019.

Payments and mobile 
Following the new opportunities created by the European Payment Services Directive (PSD2),[5] in force as of January 2018, Poste Italiane created a new division to unify payment, mobile and digital services under a single unit. The new division takes over the mobile phone operations of PosteMobile[6] and continues to be a provider of digital services for the Public Sector as an Identity Provider through the PosteID digital identity service, accredited by the Public Digital Identity System (SPID). Poste Italiane S.p.A. is also a partner of PagoPA, the electronic payments system of the Public Sector.

Insurance 
Poste Italiane S.p.A. operates in the insurance business through PosteVita and Poste Assicura, offering life and casualty insurance products. Poste Vita additionally offers investment and savings products through the BancoPosta distribution platform.

Sustainability 
In 2018 Poste Italiane S.p.A. adopted an ESG (Environmental, Social and Governance) strategic plan consisting of objectives that concern integrity and transparency, staff development, support for the region and the country, customer experience, decarbonisation of buildings and logistics and sustainable finance.

Small Municipalities 
Since 2018, Poste Italiane S.p.A. has introduced, in collaboration with the Mayors of Italy, a programme for supporting small Italian municipalities by strengthening its presence throughout the country, urban redevelopment and security measures in the areas adjacent to Post Offices. The initiative is part of the broader Environmental, Social and Governance strategic plan which aims to support the development of the country.

Commercial network - Post Office Network 
In the course of 2020, a new commercial model was introduced. With the new structure, the geographical responsibilities of the commercial functions of the Macro Territorial areas have been redefined, from 6 to 12.

The new organisational model of the post office network is based on a "Hub & Spoke" logic ¹, which helps, especially in smaller post offices in efficiency and operational continuity.

The Post Office Network function manages the commercial front end for the retail segment and is in charge of Macro Area offices, Branches and Post Offices covering the entire country.

¹ Network management and development system in which connections are made, using by analogy an expression referring to the bicycle wheel, from the spoke to the hub and vice versa. In this specific case, the Hub Office Manager is responsible for coordinating resources in terms of planning personnel attendance and managing replacements in the event of sudden absences, as well as providing commercial support, especially for products sold at the counter.

Competitors 
Comparisons with listed European postal operators are (Bpost, PostNL, Austrian Post, La Poste, CTT Correios, Deutsche Post-DHL, and Royal Mail) on operating data by business (express courier and parcel services and mail services).

References

External links

 

Financial services companies established in 1862
Companies based in Rome
Italy
Government-owned companies of Italy
Postal system of Italy
Partly privatized companies of Italy
Banks of Italy